Lópezite is a rare red chromate mineral with chemical formula: K2Cr2O7. It crystallizes in the triclinic crystal system.

It occurs as rare vug fillings in nitrate ores in association with tarapacáite (K2CrO4), dietzeite and ulexite in the Chilean Atacama and is reported from the Bushveld igneous complex of South Africa. Lópezite was first described in 1937 for an occurrence in Iquique Province, Chile and named after Chilean mining engineer Emiliano López Saa (1871–1959).

Most lopezite offered for sale to collectors is artificially produced. Synthetic varieties also exhibit monoclinic crystals.

References

Potassium minerals
Chromate minerals
Triclinic minerals
Minerals in space group 2